is a passenger railway station located in the Takebe-chō neighborhood of Kita-ku of the city of Okayama, Okayama Prefecture, Japan. It is operated by West Japan Railway Company (JR West).

Lines

Station layout
The station consists of two ground-level opposed side platforms connected by a footbridge. There used to be a large wooden station building built at the time of its opening, which was relatively well maintained, but on February 1, 2005, it was rebuilt into a concrete building on the occasion of the Okayama National Athletic Meet. At that time, the position of the station building moved about 40 meters toward Okayama. Platform 2 is adjacent to the station building and there is a rain shelter on Platform 1.The station is unattended.

Platforms

Adjacent stations

History
Kanagawa Station opened on December 21, 1898 with the opening of the Tsuyama Line.  With the privatization of the Japan National Railways (JNR) on April 1, 1987, the station came under the aegis of the West Japan Railway Company.

Passenger statistics
In fiscal 2019, the station was used by an average of 816 passengers daily..

Surrounding area
Okayama City Kita Ward Office Mitsu Branch (former Mitsu Town Office)
Okayama Prefectural Okayama Mitsu High School
Okayama Municipal Mitsu Junior High School

See also
List of railway stations in Japan

References

External links

 Kanagawa Station Official Site

Railway stations in Okayama
Tsuyama Line
Railway stations in Japan opened in 1898